David Walker (born 1908, date of death unknown) was an English professional footballer who played as a forward or left half. He made 330 appearances in the Football League for Walsall and Brighton & Hove Albion.

Life and career
Walker was born in Walsall, where he played local football for Walsall Town and Walsall LMS before signing for Football League Third Division North club Walsall in 1926. He played as a forward for Walsall, and scored 7 goals from 20 League matches spread over three seasons. In 1929, he signed for Brighton & Hove Albion of the Third Division South. Walker began his Brighton career in the forward line, and scored 14 goals from 35 appearances in his first three seasons, but was converted to left half and established himself as a first-team regular in that position. He captained the side in the last two seasons before the Football League was abandoned for the duration of the Second World War, and finished his Albion career with 28 goals from 310 league appearances, 30 from 359 in all competitions.

References

1908 births
Year of death missing
Sportspeople from Walsall
English footballers
Association football forwards
Association football wing halves
Walsall F.C. players
Brighton & Hove Albion F.C. players
English Football League players